Photinula lahillei is a species of sea snail, a marine gastropod mollusk in the family Calliostomatidae.

References

External links
 To Biodiversity Heritage Library (2 publications)
 To Encyclopedia of Life
 To World Register of Marine Species

Calliostomatidae
Gastropods described in 1902